Matihetihe is a community in the Hokianga area of Northland, New Zealand. The Warawara Forest lies to the north. The Matihetihe Stream runs into the Tasman Sea to the west. The locality is named for the tihetihe tumbleweed that grows in the local sand dunes. Matehetihe is part of the Hokianga North statistical area. For demographics of this area, see Panguru.

History and culture
Matehetihe Marae is affiliated with Te Rarawa iwi.

Education
Matihetihe School is a coeducational full primary (years 1-8) school with a roll of  students as of  The school was founded in 1890, and was initially a part-time Native School taught at the Matihetihe whare. The artist Ralph Hotere attended this school.

Notes

Far North District
Populated places in the Northland Region